Concentra Inc., is a national health care establishment founded in 1979 in Amarillo, Texas. The headquarters of the corporation is in Addison, Texas and runs approximately 520 urgent care locations across 44 states. The company is linked with over 1,000 physicians and 1,285 physical therapists. Concentra also offers a variety of health improvement solutions to companies and manages over 140 employer-owned medical facilities.

The key areas of concentration for the firm include occupational health, physical therapy, health and wellness, and urgent care.

History

Concentra's forerunner was formed in Amarillo, Texas, by three physicians who opened the first occupational health facility. The same occupational health strategy was used by same physicians in their second facility, which opened in Garland, Texas in 1985.

OccuCenters, Inc. managed the network of medical centers between 1985 and 1997. The parent business of OccuCenters, Dallas-based OccuSystems, Inc., combined with Boston-based CRA Managed Care, Inc. in 1997 to establish Concentra Managed Care, Inc., a publicly listed firm. The company's shares were made private in 1999, and the name was changed to Concentra Incorporated in 2001. A period of expansion followed as Concentra grew to include health-related businesses such as network services, bill review, case management, independent medical examinations, and PPO networks. Following a series of sale deals in 2006 and 2007, Concentra restricted its focus on occupational health, medical center growth, and wellness and preventive care.

The firm began its urgent care project in 2007 in response to the rising need for a cost-effective alternative to hospital emergency rooms for non-emergency ailments. It required a uniform platform to support its strategic expansion goal and unify more than 330 locations in 40 states that differed in design, operational needs, and brand mark as part of this endeavor.

In December 2010, Humana announced its acquisition of Concentra for approximately $790 million. Welsh, Carson, Anderson & Stowe, a New York City-based private equity firm, had previously owned a majority of Concentra's equity since 1999.

Humana Inc. (NYSE: HUM) announced in June 2015 the sale of Concentra Inc. (Concentra) shares to a joint venture between Select Medical Holdings Corporation (Select Medical) and Welsh, Carson, Anderson & Stowe, a private equity fund, for approximately $1.055 billion in cash. Select Medical's acquisition of Concentra advances the organization's goal of developing a highly profitable occupational-medicine business channel to complement its existing portfolio of long-term acute care hospitals, inpatient and outpatient rehabilitation clinics, and contract rehabilitation services. Concentra's income is generated by patient visits to its medical centers, with the remaining 20% generated by its Health Solutions companies.

In February 2018, Concentra combined with U.S. HealthWorks in a transaction between Select Medical and Dignity Health. 

Every day, more than 30,000 patients visit Concentra's medical centers. According to the Bureau of Labor Statistics, Concentra treats one out of every seven occupational injuries in the United States.

Litigation
In 2005, a class action lawsuit was brought against Concentra and its subsidiaries, Concentra Managed Care  and Focus Healthcare Management . It alleged that Concentra and its subsidiaries engaged in silent PPO activities and unfair repricing tactics. The lawsuit was initiated on behalf of First State Orthopaedics and all U.S. physicians with workers' compensation or car accident bills that had been repriced by Concentra or its subsidiaries. The complaint was based on allegations of "breach of contract/duty of good faith and fair dealing, tortious interference with existing and prospective contractual relations and unjust enrichment".

A $3.7 million settlement was reached, with Concentra agreeing to pay $2,000 to each plaintiff as well as legal expenses. However, the settlement terms were criticized by many of the doctors, supported by medical professional associations, such as the American Medical Association (AMA) and the Connecticut State Medical Society (CSMS). The AMA filed an objection with the court, claiming that "the defendants' claimed modifications are illusory, impossible of verification, and in any event insufficient to rectify the [said] losses." The terms of the settlement, according to CSMS, "provide very little relief to aggrieved physicians" and would require them to "give up virtually all legal claims they may have" that are tangentially related to the claims in this suit. CSMS recommended that doctors who were substantially aggrieved consider opting out of the class action lawsuit to retain the option of pursuing an individual claim against the company in the future.

In 2009, Concentra was part of a class action workers' compensation case, Josephine Gianzero et al. v. Wal-Mart Stores Inc. et al, alongside Wal-Mart and its insurance adjuster Claims Management Inc. (CMI). The lawsuit was filed in Colorado federal court on behalf of 13,521 Wal-Mart employees who had received treatment for work-related injuries. According to Denver Business Journal, the workers sued Wal-Mart, CMI, and Concentra for "interfer[ing] with and limit[ing] the independent judgment of certain medical providers who treated injured workers employed by [Wal-Mart] in Colorado who sustained on-the-job injuries". After fighting the charges for three years, Judge Robert Blackburn approved a settlement of $8 million, requiring Concentra to pay $4 million, through its insurer, and Wal-Mart and CMI to pay the other half. Concentra was ordered to pay $520 to each Wal-Mart employee that had been treated at one of its offices and $50 to employees who were treated at other clinics.

References

External links
Concentra Official website

Companies based in Addison, Texas
Health care companies based in Texas
Health care companies established in 1979
1979 establishments in Texas
2010 mergers and acquisitions
2015 mergers and acquisitions